The 2008 Continental Indoor Football League season is the league's third overall season.  The season began on Friday, March 7, and ended on Sunday, June 29th, with the CIFL Championship Game.

Standings
Final Standings

 No color is given to Rochester due to their withdrawal from the league
 Blue indicates eliminated from playoff contention
 Green indicates clinched playoff berth
 Yellow indicates clinched division title
 Red indicates clinched conference title
 Gray will indicate clinched conference title and home field advantage throughout playoffs

Continental Bowl Playoffs

 Note: The Lehigh Valley/New England Playoff Game was played at Stabler Arena, Lehigh Valley had home field advantage, regardless of New England having a better record
 Due to Rochester's withdrawal from the league, Saginaw had a first round home playoff game against Marion

2008 Award Winners
CIFL Most Valuable Player - David Gater, Kalamazoo Xplosion
Offensive Player of the Year - Randy Bell, Rock River Raptors
Defensive Player of the Year - David Gater, Kalamazoo Xplosion
Special Teams Player of the Year - Brad Selent, Kalamazoo Xplosion
Coach of the Year - Mike Sparks, Kalamazoo Xplosion

External links
 CIFL Website
 2008 Stat Leaders